Hegerty is a surname. Notable people with the surname include:

 Anne Hegerty (born 1958), English television personality and quizzer
 Francis Hegerty (born 1982), Australian rower
 Nannette Hegerty, American police chief

See also
 Hagerty
 Hegarty